Mashrak–Thawe Extension Railway was owned by the Government of India and worked by Bengal and North Western Railway.

History 

The  metre gauge line from Mashrak to Thawe was opened 12 January 1931. The Mashrak-Thawe Extension Railway was merged into the Oudh and Tirhut Railway on 1 January 1943.

Conversion to broad gauge 

The railway line was converted to  broad gauge in 2017.

Notes
 Rao, M.A. (1988). Indian Railways, New Delhi: National Book Trust
 Chapter 1 - Evolution of Indian Railways-Historical Background

Metre gauge railways in India
Defunct railway companies of India
Railway companies established in 1931
Railway companies disestablished in 1943
History of rail transport in Uttar Pradesh